Ahmed Abdel Mougod Soliman (born 19 December 1970) is an Egyptian long-distance runner. He competed in the men's marathon at the 2000 Summer Olympics.

References

1970 births
Living people
Athletes (track and field) at the 2000 Summer Olympics
Egyptian male long-distance runners
Egyptian male marathon runners
Olympic athletes of Egypt
Place of birth missing (living people)